William Augustine Ogden (October 10, 1841 in Franklin County, Ohio – October 14, 1897 in Toledo, Ohio) was an American composer, especially of church music and hymns, choir conductor and educator.

He served in the 30th Indiana Volunteer Infantry during the American Civil War and organized a male voice choir, which became well known in the Army of the Cumberland.

He published his first song book, The Silver Song in 1870. In 1887 he became superintendent of music in the public schools of Toledo, Ohio.

External links
 

1841 births
1897 deaths
American male composers
American composers
Composers of Christian music
19th-century American musicians
19th-century American male musicians